Rock On is the second album by Raydio, led by guitarist/songwriter/producer Ray Parker Jr. issued in March 1979 on Arista Records The album reached No. 4 on the US Billboard Top Soul Albums chart and No. 45 on the US Billboard 200 chart. Rock On was also certified Gold in the US by the RIAA.

History
Like the debut, it features eight tracks, most of which were written by Parker.  It reached a peak of number 45 on the charts and featured two singles; one of them being "You Can't Change That", which was another top ten pop hit, peaking at number 9. The other single, "More Than One Way to Love a Woman", failed to chart on pop, but did make number 25 on R&B.

Track listing

Personnel

Raydio
Arnell Carmichael – vocals
Darren Carmichael – vocals
Ray Parker Jr. – vocals, guitars, bass, keyboards, synthesizers
Charles Fearing – guitars
Larry Tolbert – drums, percussion

Additional Personnel
Jack Ashford – percussion
Norma Jean Bell, Horatio Gordon– saxophone
Ollie E. Brown – drums, percussion, vocals
Ken Peterson – trumpet, vocals
Sylvester Rivers – piano
Cheryl Brown, Valorie Jones, Francis Pearlman – additional vocals

Charts and Certifications

Charts

Singles

Certifications

References

External links
 Rock On at Discogs

1979 albums
Arista Records albums
Raydio albums
Albums produced by Ray Parker Jr.